Ninja-Russia relation refers to the international relations between the Ninja, Japanese covert agents, and historical Russian countries such as the Russian Empire and the Soviet Union. Russia was the first western country that ninja confronted and among the earliest countries that recognized the existence of ninja and researched them.

Under isolation of Japan 
In Hirosaki Domain, there was a group of ninja troops named Hayamichi no mono (早道之者) which were established from the 17th century to 1872. Originally established by Sugiyama Yoshinari (杉山吉成), the grandson of Ishida Mitsunari and the Kōga ninja Nakagawa Kohayato (中川小隼人), they dealt with the Ainu on issues such as Shakushain's revolt. When Russian ships began to come to Ezo, Hayamichi no mono was mobilized for guarding. In Bakumatsu era, about 60 ninjas served Hirosaki Domain as Hayamichi no mono.

In 1807 Nikolai Rezanov ordered his subordinate Nikolai Khvostov to attack Ezo. During this battle Hirayama Gyozo, descendant of Iga ninja suggested to the Shogunate to send troops consisting of criminals similar to the ninja troops. This plan was never executed.

Ninja research in Russia 
In the early 20th century, some research about ninja developed.

Roman Kim, the Koryo-saram born in Vladivostok, went to Japan to study at 7 years old. After returning to Russia he became an instructor in Japanese language and history of far east of Moscow Institute of Oriental Studies. He gave a detailed account of ninja and ninjutsu in the annotation of "The Roots of the Japanese Sun" (1927) by Boris Pilnyak. This was the first study of ninja in Russia and one of the earliest foreign researchers of Ninja. Until the 1930s, Kim ordered sources from Japan and planned to complete a new paper about ninja.
Actually, Kim himself was a spy of the Soviet Union; in 1937 he stole a confidential document from the Japanese Embassy and received Order of the Red Star. He was arrested as Japanese spy in the same year, and engaged in the translation of Japanese confidential documents in prison till the end of WWII. His new paper about ninja was never finished. After the war, he became an author of spy fiction, including a novel about ninja.

Anti-Soviet activity 
Seiko Fujita, 14th Headmaster or Soke of Kōga-ryū, taught arts such as Ninjutsu and Taijutsu in Nakano School. Many of students of Nakano engaged with anti-Soviet activity. For example, Sadao Ōgi (扇貞雄) supported the White movement in Harbin, Tōkichi Harada involved in espionage and re-educated former Soviet spy as Japanese spy. Many students graduated from Nakano school were the members of secret military agency in Harbin and commanded some troops composed of Russian exiles, such as Baikal Cossacks and other Russian people, in Harbin, Hailin, and Hailar.

Jinichi Kawakami, head of Banke Shinobinoden, stated that his master Shōzō Ishida belonged to the secret military agency in Harbin.

Modern Ninja researchers in Russia 

Fyodor Kubasov (Фёдор Кубасов), born in Saint Petersburg studied about ninja in Mie University under Yūji Yamada, one of the most prominent ninja researchers in Japan from 2007. The contents of his research ranged from the relationship between Ninja and yamabushi to oversea reactions to ninja such as the writings by his precursor, Roman Kim. He also worked as the English translator of Banke Shinobinoden.

In popular culture
Red Shadow – Olga (Alina Kabaeva), Russian thief who fought with kunoichi (Kumiko Asō).
Metal Gear Solid 2: Sons of Liberty – Olga Gurlukovich, a Russian mercenary who appeared as "Cyborg Ninja".Grisaia: Phantom Trigger'' – one of main characters, Murasaki (voiced by Atsumi Tanezaki), calls herself a Russian ninja.

References

See also 
 Ninja
 Plastun - Special military unit of Cossack resembling ninja.
 Foreign ninja
 Japan-Russia relations
 Ninja presence in Myanmar

R
R